Stanislav Fořt (born 29 August 1977) is a Slovak politician who served as a Member of the National Council in 2010 to 2012.

Life and education 
Fořt was born in Martin. He studied Accounting at the University of Economics in Bratislava, graduating in 2000. Additionally, he study Law at the University of Trnava, graduating in 2009.

Political career 
In 2010 Slovak parliamentary election Fořt ran on the list of the Freedom and Solidarity party, which he co-founded, and gained a seat. In 2011, he became the first male Slovak politician to publicly come out as gay. In an interview with the Sme daily he stated he hoped his coming out will help other LGBT people to feel more comfortable in Slovakia.

Fořt failed to retain his seat in the 2012 Slovenian presidential election and subsequently announced his retirement from politics. Nonetheless, he unsuccessfully ran again in the 2016 Slovak parliamentary election.

References 

1977 births
Living people
Freedom and Solidarity politicians
University of Economics in Bratislava alumni
People from Martin, Slovakia
Slovak LGBT politicians
Members of the National Council (Slovakia) 2010-2012